Here Comes the Kraken is a Mexican  melodic deathcore band from Aguascalientes, formed in 2007. They have released three full-length studio albums, two extended plays, and one demo.

History
The band was formed in 2007 by brothers Tore González (lead guitar) and Deivis González (drums). They later recruited José "TTS" Manuel on vocals, Alexandro Hernandez on bass and Alex Guardado on rhythm guitar. Their debut eponymous album (Here Comes The Kraken) was released in 2009, which was accompanied with an extensive tour in Mexico and Europe. They then followed this up with an EP entitled The Omen in 2010. Both of these releases shared a similar, very heavy death metal influenced sound.

In May 2010, they won at the Indie-O Music Award for "Metal Band of the Year".

Musical style
The band's musical style is an extreme metal genre known as deathcore, mixing death metal and metalcore. However, since the band's 2011 sophomore album Hate, Greed and Death, they have inducted nu metal influences into their music.

Members

Current members
Tore González – guitars (2007–present)
David "Deivis" González – drums (2007–present)
José "TTS" Manuel – vocals (2007–2009, 2010–2011, 2012–2014, 2016–present) 
Freddy – bass (2007–2009, 2019–present)

Past members
Bnj Martinez – vocals (2015–2016)
Alexandro "Alexa/Picofaradio" Hernandez- bass (2009–2016), vocals (2014–2015)
Eddie Hermida – vocals (2011)
Daniel Weber – vocals (2011)
Jero – keyboards, turntables (2009–2011)
Gelar Haro – vocals (2009–2011)
José Macario – bass (2018; Arcadia Libre, Parazit)
José Paredes – vocals (2009–2010)
Mike – vocals (2011–2012)
 Alex Guardado – rhythm guitar (2007–2016)

Timeline

Discography
Albums
 Here Comes The Kraken (2009)
 Hate, Greed & Death (2011)
 Here Comes The Kraken (Reissue) (2013)
 H.C.T.K (2019)

EPs
 The Omen (2010)

Demos
 Demo (2007)

References

External links

 

2007 establishments in Mexico
Deathcore musical groups
Mexican heavy metal musical groups
Musical groups established in 2007
Musical groups from Aguascalientes
Musical quartets
Nu metal musical groups